Truman S. Stevens (December 20, 1867 – August 19, 1950) was a justice of the Iowa Supreme Court from May 1, 1917, to December 31, 1934, appointed from Fremont County, Iowa.

References

Justices of the Iowa Supreme Court